Lost Battalion may refer to:

Lost Battalion (World War I), American units which were isolated by Germans in 1918
Lost Battalion (Europe, World War II), an American battalion which was surrounded by Germans in 1944
Lost Battalion (Pacific, World War II), an American battalion and survivors from a ship's crew taken prisoner early in the Pacific War 
Lost Battalion (China), the Chinese Lost Battalion during the Defense of Sihang Warehouse in 1937
The Lost Battalion (1919 film), a 1919 film about the World War I event
Lost Battalion (1960 film) a 1960 Filipino World War II film 
The Lost Battalion (2001 film), a remake of the 1919 film